Kick Energy is an energy drink marketed in the UK by creator Global Brands. Since the product was first launched it has grown to become the second largest energy drink brand in the on trade drinks market in the UK. It now controls 15.3% market share of the On Trade Functional Energy Market. Global Brands sells and distributes about 1,000,000 cans of Kick Energy in the UK per month. Kick Energy is currently available in 250ml and 500ml cans.

Marketing 

In 2009, Kick Energy ran a £1.9m marketing support package to promote the brand which included sponsoring a Luminar venues tour by boyband JLS Kick Energy’s marketing campaign includes branded taxis in every major UK city, trade and consumer PR and exhibitions at key trade shows. Kick Energy has also invested heavily in a programme of sports and motorsports sponsorship, including the Kawasaki World Super Bike Team, as well as the Stobart KICK M-Sport Ford World Rally Team  and Powerleague 5-a-side Football which are based in Paisley but operate 45 sites across the UK and are visited by approximately 125,000 customers each week.

Kick Energy sponsors the Steve Perez Rally team., and from 2012 Chesterfield FC.

References

External links 
 
 
  
 

Chesterfield, Derbyshire
Companies based in Derbyshire
Energy drinks